My Only Love Song is a South Korean streaming television series produced by Netflix, starring Lee Jong-hyun and Gong Seung-yeon. It also has elements of fantasy since it involves time travel and a "magical van".

Synopsis 
Soo-jung (Gong Seung-yeon) is a conceited actress who believes that status and money can get you anywhere. She accidentally falls into a time-slip portal and travels to the past, specifically to 6th-century Goguryeo, one of the Three Kingdoms of Korea, while it is under the reign of King Pyeongwon. There she meets On-dal (Lee Jong-hyun), a man who loves money and will do anything to get it. However, he has a soft spot for the weak and helpless, and gives to them with a generous heart.

Cast 
Lee Jong-hyun as On-dal
Gong Seung-yeon as Song Soo-jung
Lee Jae-jin as Byun Sam-yong
Jin Ye-ju as Princess Pyunggang
Ahn Bo-hyun as Moo-myung
Park Joo-hyung as Ko Il-yong
Lee Cheol-min as Movie Director / Magistrate
Lee Yong-jik as King Pyungwon
Kim Jung-pal as Government Official
Kim Chae-eun as Mi-jin / Hwa-hong
Kim Bo-ra as Gwang-nyeo / New Manager / Princess  Pyeongon (Ko Yi-yeon)
Choi Jong-hoon as Bong Soo-hyuk (Cameo)

Episodes

Production 
The drama serves as a reunion for Lee Jong-hyun and Gong Seung-yeon, who worked together in We Got Married.

Original soundtrack

References

External links 
 
 
 

South Korean historical television series
South Korean romantic comedy television series
South Korean fantasy television series
2017 South Korean television series debuts
2017 South Korean television series endings
Korean-language Netflix original programming
Naver TV original programming
South Korean time travel television series
American time travel television series
Television series by SM Life Design Group
2010s American time travel television series